Malibu High is a 1979 American exploitation film directed by Irvin Berwick and starring Jill Lansing. The film led to a quasi-sequel, The Graduates of Malibu High.

One song by Alan Tew, "The Big One", played during the film, was the inspiration to the theme song to The People's Court.

Synopsis
High school student Kim Bentley (Jill Lansing) is having a tough time of things at the moment, she has been dumped by her boyfriend Kevin (Stuart Taylor) for rich girl Annette (Tammy Taylor), her grades are slipping and she has no money, and all her mother (Phyllis Benson) seems to care about is cleaning.  Kim tells her best friend Lucy (Katie Johnson) that the nonsense ends today. Kim's been feeling sorry for herself ever since her father hanged himself. She begins working for Tony the pimp (Alex Mann) and things start to look good for her, new clothes, new car and good grades. Annette begins to hate Kim even more and Kevin becomes jealous. Kim then meets Lance (Garth Howard) who frees her from turning tricks in a beat up old van which leads her to better clothes and nicer cars. Prostitution isn't the worst of it as Kim is forced to kill a man in self-defense when he tries to have his way with her being tied up. Kim becomes a hit woman and after murdering several people, including Annette and her father, she herself is killed on a deserted beach.

Cast
 Jill Lansing as Kim Bentley
 Stuart Taylor as Kevin
 Katie Johnson as Lucy
 Phyllis Benson as Mrs. Bentley
 Alex Mann as Tony (credited as Al Mannino)
 Tammy Taylor as Annette Ingersoll
 Garth Howard as Lance
 John Harmon as Mr. Elmhurst

Home media
The film was released on DVD on September 11, 2007 by BCI/Eclipse as part of a "Welcome to the Grindhouse Double Feature" along with Trip with the Teacher. It was later released on Blu-ray by Vinegar Syndrome on May 30, 2017.

References

External links

 Malibu High at the Disobiki.

1979 films
American exploitation films
1970s English-language films
1970s American films